Liberty Township is a township in Sullivan County, in the U.S. state of Missouri.

Liberty Township was established in 1845.

References

Townships in Missouri
Townships in Sullivan County, Missouri